Klenova or Klenová may refer to:

Klenová (Snina District), a municipality and village in Slovakia
Klenová (Klatovy District), a municipality and village in the Czech Republic
Klenová Castle, a castle in the municipality
Maria Klenova, Russian marine scientist